The Cat Creeps may refer to:

The Cat Creeps (1930 film)
The Cat Creeps (1946 film)